Long Binh is a ward of Biên Hòa in the Đồng Nai Province of Vietnam. It has an area of about 35km2 and the population in 2017 was 133,206.

History

Vietnam War

During the Vietnam War, Long Binh Post was a major U.S. Army base, logistics center, and major command headquarters for United States Army Vietnam (USARV).

2000s and 2010s
The area Long Binh, Bien Hoa, originally occupied by the Long Binh post is  largely given over to industrial use, known as Long Binh Techno Park, and a shopping complex that includes a large western-style Cora supermarket. When it opens, Line 1 of the HCMC Metro will have its terminus at Long Binh, District 9, Ho Chi Minh City; work commenced in February 2008 on the Long Binh depot.

References

Bien Hoa